Sanghavi  (born Kavya Ramesh) is an Indian actress and a model known for her work predominantly in Telugu and Tamil language films. She was one of the leading actresses in South Indian cinema for a decade from 1993 to 2004. In her career spanning 15 years, she starred in over 80 feature films - 38 in Telugu, 35 films in Tamil, six in Kannada, two in Malayalam and one film in Hindi.

Early life 
Sangavi was born in Mysore, Karnataka. Her father is Dr. D. A. Ramesh, an ENT Professor in Mysore Medical College, and her mother is Mrs. Ranjana. She did her schooling at Marimallappa High School. She is the granddaughter of Kannada film actress Aarathi's elder sister. In 1993, she made her debut with the Tamil film Amaravathi.

Personal life 
Sangavi married IT Professional Venkatesh on 3 February 2016 at Taj Vivanta, Bengaluru. The couple had a baby girl in January 2020.

Accident 
Sangavi suffered an accident in 2005 when she was travelling from Mysore to Chennai: she had a minor injury to her nose and her father, who was an ENT professor in the Mysore Medical College, performed the surgery.she made her comeback in 2019 in a film written by Naveen

Filmography

Television
 2008-2009: Gokulathil Seethai
 2013: Savitri
 2014: Kalabhairava
 Judged a show for Maa TV called Rangam
 2017: Thai Veedu
2019: Jabardasth

References

External links 
 
 

Indian television actresses
Actresses in Tamil cinema
Actresses in Kannada cinema
Actresses in Telugu cinema
Actresses in Malayalam cinema
Indian film actresses
Living people
Kannada people
Actresses from Mysore
Actresses in Hindi cinema
20th-century Indian actresses
21st-century Indian actresses
Actresses in Tamil television
Year of birth missing (living people)